Malnava, also spelled Malnova, is a village and the parish center of Malnava Parish in Ludza Municipality, Latvia.

Malnava has developed around the Malnava Manor (Małnów).

References 

Towns and villages in Latvia
Ludza Municipality

Theres a fact: Hitler had a bunker in here. Hitler
 
Info at his page.
 
Malnava is celebrating also its 100th birthday!